CoFluent Design is a supplier of electronic system-level (ESL) modeling and simulation software. CoFluent is headquartered in Nantes, France, and has sales offices in Paris, France, San Jose, California, and Tokyo, Japan.

History
Original CoFluent technology development was initiated by the Ecole polytechnique of the University of Nantes in France by Professor Jean-Paul Calvez and his research team. The technology represents 20 years of research on a methodology for the design of electronic systems called MCSE (French for Méthodologie de Conception de Systèmes Electroniques), which is in the public domain .

In 2003, CoFluent was spun off as an independent company.

In 2007, CoFluent raised funds from venture capital firms. CoFluent Design key people include CEO, Stephane Leclercq, and Director, Vincent Perrier.

CoFluent Design provides system modeling and simulation solutions that enable embedded system and chip designers to imagine and validate new concepts and architectures.

In 2011, CoFluent Design was acquired by Intel. Under the terms of the acquisition, CoFluent Studio has also become the property of Intel. All CoFluent employees have also been picked up by Intel and will continue to provide customer support.

Products
 CoFluent Studio is a visual model-driven engineering (MDE) software for modeling and simulating complex multi-core hardware/software systems. Graphical input is based on the MCSE notations, a domain-specific language (DSL) for describing electronic system behavioral and architectural models with time and performance properties. MCSE is very similar to the MARTE unified modeling language (UML) profile and SysML. CoFluent Studio generates transaction-level modeling SystemC code for early architecture exploration and performance analysis. It is based on the Eclipse modeling framework (EMF) technology.
 CoFluent Reader is a free CoFluent model viewer and simulation player.

See also
 Virtutech

References

External links
 
 Ecole polytechnique de l'université de Nantes
 SystemC
 Eclipse modeling framework
 SysML

Electronic design automation companies
Companies based in San Jose, California
Intel acquisitions